n.paradoxa: international feminist art journal was a biannual academic journal covering feminist art criticism and the work of women artists since the 1970s. It was published by KT press and the editor-in-chief was Katy Deepwell (London).

The print journal (printed as volumes) was established by Deepwell in 1998. Prior to this, n.paradoxa existed as an online journal (issues 1-21) which was established in 1996 and this parallel edition online ran until 2010 with entirely different content to the print journal. Each volume of n.paradoxa focused on a particular theme and typically included articles devoted to art theory and criticism from a feminist perspective, as well as interviews with artists. The website contained extensive online resources on feminism in the visual arts internationally, including reviews of exhibits, books, and websites. n.paradoxa participated in the Documenta 12 magazines project as part of the 2007 documenta exhibition in Kassel. After 2011, volumes were simultaneously published in print and electronic format online.

The journal ceased publication in 2017.

References

External links 
 

Visual art journals
Feminist journals
Publications established in 1996
English-language journals
Biannual journals
Publications disestablished in 2017
Defunct journals